The Ballerina Stakes is a Canadian Thoroughbred horse race run annually at Hastings Racecourse, Vancouver, British Columbia. Held in late September or early October, it is open to fillies and mares, age three and older.

The race was first contested in 1969 and is run over nine furlongs on dirt.

Records
Speed  record:
 1:49.30 - Class Included (2012)

Most wins:
 3 -Magic Code (1998, 1999, 2000)

Most wins by a trainer:
 5 - David Forster (1993, 1998, 1999, 2000, 2013)

Winners since 1998

Earlier winners 

 1969 - Nanahanna
 1970 - 
 1971 - 
 1972 - 
 1973 - 
 1974 - 
 1975 - Pirate Queen
 1976 - Savanna Blue Jeans
 1977 - Reasonable Win
 1978 - Title Victory
 1979 - Tolita
 1980 - Three Leaders
 1981 - Gray On Gray
 1982 - Belle of Rainier
 1983 - Okan Dee Select
 1984 - Unknown
 1985 - Gallant Pearl
 1986 - Royal Garter
 1987 - Cruisin Two Su
 1988 - Delta Colleen
 1989 - 
 1990 - 
 1991 - Avants Gold
 1992 - Delta Colleen
 1993 - Pilgrims Treasure
 1994 - Above The Table
 1995 - Sophie J
 1996 - Kims Turn To Star
 1997 - Ever Lasting

See also
 List of Canadian flat horse races

References

Recurring sporting events established in 1969
1969 establishments in British Columbia